Chichibu Tetsudo (秩父鉄道, -tetsudō) officially refers to:
 Chichibu Railway, a Japanese railway company
However, it is often used in discourse to mean:
 Chichibu Mainline, a railway line operated by Chichibu Railway